Falcon Heights is a suburb of Saint Paul and a city in Ramsey County, Minnesota, United States. The population was 5,321 at the 2010 census.  It became a village in 1949 and a city in 1973.

Falcon Heights is the home of the University of Minnesota's St. Paul Campus; the Gabbert Raptor Center and Les Bolstad Golf Course, the Minnesota State Fairgrounds, and the Gibbs Museum of Pioneer and Dakotah Life. Its University Grove neighborhood is known for its modern architecture.

History
Heman Gibbs settled in the 1850s near the modern intersection of Cleveland and Larpenteur Avenues. His homestead is on the National Register of Historic Places and his home is a county museum.

On September 2, 1901, then-Vice President Theodore Roosevelt first publicly used the African proverb "Speak softly and carry a big stick" in a speech at the Minnesota State Fairgrounds, which was still a part of St. Paul at the time. Roosevelt became president just two weeks later, upon the assassination of William McKinley, and built the phrase into his concept of Big Stick Diplomacy.

Between the 1910s and 1930s, Curtiss Northwest Airport was located at the intersection of Snelling and Larpenteur Avenues. The airfield was important in Minnesota aviation history, hosting Charles Lindbergh, Speed Holman, and Phoebe Fairgrave. Part of the land is now a city park named Curtiss Field.

In the 1930s, a real estate agent named Faulkner developed land owned by a 3M executive and named this development—Falcon Heights—after himself. The first house arose in 1937.

In 1949 residents rejected annexation by Roseville or St. Paul, and voted to incorporate themselves. The expanded Falcon Heights included the University of Minnesota Golf Course and Test Fields as well as the Minnesota State Fairgrounds. Two-thirds of Falcon Heights is public land, chiefly the university and state fair.

Falcon Heights is where a legally armed 32-year-old African American man, Philando Castille was fatally shot by police, causing civil unrest, and calls for police reform and justice for the man, and for African Americans in general.

Parks
Falcon Heights Community Park and Curtiss Field have recreational sports in the summer for kids and an ice rink and warming house in the winter. The community park also has a soccer field and a fitness course. Grove Park, in University Grove, also has a temporary warming house and ice rink in the winter.

Geography

Minnesota Highway 51 / Snelling Avenue serves as a main route in the community.

Falcon Heights is bordered by Lauderdale to the west, St. Paul to the south and east and Roseville to the north and east.

Demographics

2020 census

Note: the US Census treats Hispanic/Latino as an ethnic category. This table excludes Latinos from the racial categories and assigns them to a separate category. Hispanics/Latinos can be of any race.===2010 census===

2010 census
As of the census of 2010, there were 5,321 people, 2,131 households, and 1,259 families living in the city. The racial makeup of the city was 73.3% White, 8.0% African American, 0.5% Native American, 15.0% Asian, 0.7% from other races, and 2.5% from two or more races. Hispanic or Latino of any race were 3.0% of the population.

There were 2,131 households, of which 26.8% had children under the age of 18 living with them, 48.7% were married couples living together, 7.6% had a female householder with no husband present, 2.7% had a male householder with no wife present, and 40.9% were non-families. 30.3% of all households were made up of individuals, and 10% had someone living alone who was 65 years of age or older. The average household size was 2.28 and the average family size was 2.91.

The median age in the city was 31.8 years. 19.4% of residents were under the age of 18; 16.8% were between the ages of 18 and 24; 29.7% were from 25 to 44; 21.8% were from 45 to 64; and 12.3% were 65 years of age or older. The gender makeup of the city was 46.9% male and 53.1% female.

2000 census
As of the census of 2000, there were 5,572 people, 2,103 households, and 1,434 families living in the city. The racial makeup of the city was 77.66% White, 3.36% African American, 0.43% Native American, 14.95% Asian, 0.13% Pacific Islander, 1.33% from other races, and 2.15% from two or more races. Hispanic or Latino of any race were 3.09% of the population.

There were 2,103 households, out of which 32.6% had children under the age of 18 living with them, 58.9% were married couples living together, 7.2% had a female householder with no husband present, and 31.8% were non-families. 25.6% of all households were made up of individuals, and 8.8% had someone living alone who was 65 years of age or older. The average household size was 2.41 and the average family size was 2.91.

In the city, the population was spread out, with 21.5% under the age of 18, 17.0% from 18 to 24, 32.1% from 25 to 44, 17.3% from 45 to 64, and 12.2% who were 65 years of age or older. The median age was 31 years. For every 100 females, there were 92.7 males. For every 100 females age 18 and over, there were 88.7 males.

The median income for a household in the city was $51,382, and the median income for a family was $59,415. Males had a median income of $43,693 versus $34,757 for females. The per capita income for the city was $25,370.  About 8.8% of families and 9.6% of the population were below the poverty line, including 13.4% of those under age 18 and 5.2% of those age 65 or over.

Politics

Education
Falcon Heights is served by the Roseville Area School District. Falcon Heights Elementary is the only school within the city boundary. The elementary school features a park with two playgrounds, one of them built in 2006.

In popular culture
The 2001 film Sugar & Spice was partly filmed in Falcon Heights.

A small part of the 1996 film Jingle All the Way starring Arnold Schwarzenegger was filmed at Falcon Heights Elementary.

References

External links

Falcon Heights, MN – Official site 

Cities in Minnesota
Cities in Ramsey County, Minnesota